Barak Braunshtain (born 10 June 1999), is a Hong Kong-born Israeli professional football player who plays as a midfielder and is currently a free agent.

Club career
Braunshtain made his debut for Kitchee on October 29, 2017 in the Sapling Cup. Kitchee won 4–0 against HK Pegasus.

Braunshtain made his full senior league debut for Kitchee on February 3, 2018. He came on as a substitute for Diego Forlán in the 59th minute of the match. Kitchee would go on to a 5–1 win over Lee Man.

Braunshtain became a popular player amongst the Kitchee SC fans club. The Kitchee fans would often chant Hava Nagila a traditional jewish folk song in the stadiums in reference to Braunshtains Israeli and Jewish origins.

On 27 September 2020, Braunshtain scored an impressive free-kick against KC Southern District in the Sapling Cup final, guiding Kitchee SC to win the 2019-20 Sapling Cup and their second Sapling Cup title.  

On 24 July 2021, Braunshtain featured in a summer exhibition match against reigning English Premier League champions, Manchester City in front of 22,000 fans at the Hong Kong Stadium. Braunshtain was substituted on at half time, contributing to Kitchee's only goal of the match. The match finished 1-6 for Manchester City.

On 25 August 2021, Braunshtain left Kitchee.

Personal life
Braunshtain was born and raised in Hong Kong. He was educated at The Island School.

Honours
Kitchee
Hong Kong Premier League: 2016–17, 2017–18, 2019–20
Hong Kong Senior Shield: 2016–17, 2018–19
Hong Kong FA Cup: 2016-17, 2017–18, 2018–19
Hong Kong Sapling Cup: 2017–18, 2019–20

References

External links
 
 
 Barak Braunshtain: Sport1 news article Israel

1999 births
Living people
Israeli footballers
Association football midfielders
Hong Kong Premier League players
Kitchee SC players
People educated at Island School